Robert P. Williams (September 8, 1841 – July 11, 1910) was an American politician. He served as the State Treasurer of Missouri from 1901 to 1905.

References

1841 births
1910 deaths
State treasurers of Missouri
Missouri Democrats
19th-century American politicians
People from Fayette, Missouri